The following is a list of NHL regular season outdoor games broadcasters, including those in Canada and in the United States.

The first NHL Heritage Classic was played in 2003 at Commonwealth Stadium between the Edmonton Oilers and the Montreal Canadiens. Although the Oilers had suggested the idea of hosting an outdoor game as early as the mid-1980s, the genesis of the 2003 event was the "Cold War" outdoor game played two years prior between Michigan State University and the University of Michigan.

One year later, NBC Sports Executive VP Jon Miller pitched the idea of an annual outdoor television event to the NHL in 2004 "but they didn't find the concept workable." In December 2006, Miller found an ally in then NHL Executive VP/Business & Media John Collins, who embraced the idea. The first Winter Classic was held January 1, 2008, between the Buffalo Sabres and Pittsburgh Penguins at Ralph Wilson Stadium in Orchard Park, New York. The game had an NHL-record crowd of 71,217 fans in attendance. The success of the 2008 NHL Winter Classic led the NHL to schedule a second one for 2009, held at Wrigley Field in Chicago, Illinois, on January 1, 2009, matching the Detroit Red Wings against the Chicago Blackhawks.

That game had the highest American television ratings of any hockey game in 33 years. The success of the 2009 NHL Winter Classic has solidified "the Classic" as an annual event from then on. The Winter Classic was officially made a permanent part of the NHL schedule through at least January 1, 2021, as part of the league's television contract with the NBC Sports Group. The Winter Classic is also broadcast in Canada by the league's TV partner there too.

Unlike the annual Winter Classic games, Heritage Classic games have been held infrequently.

For the 2013–14 NHL season, the NHL introduced three other outdoor games known as the Stadium Series. The 2014 Stadium Series was held in Los Angeles, California, New York City and Chicago, Illinois. Another Stadium Series game was held the following season in Santa Clara, California, with two more games scheduled for the 2015–16 season in Denver, Colorado and Minneapolis, Minnesota.

To celebrate the league's centennial anniversary in 2017, two special outdoor games were held: The NHL Centennial Classic on January 1, 2017, to kickoff the year; and then the NHL 100 Classic played on December 16.

United States

Notes
The first outdoor game between two NHL teams was an official pre-season match-up on September 27, 1991. The game took place in the parking lot of Caesars Palace in Las Vegas, Nevada, and featured the Los Angeles Kings and the New York Rangers. The game was televised live on Prime Ticket, and, due to its uniqueness, has since been repeated numerous times on other networks, such as MSG Network and the NHL Network. During the game, Kings goaltender Kelly Hrudey wore a camera mounted on his mask, and shots from his point of view were used during the broadcast.
There was no separate American live telecast of the 2003 Heritage Classic. ESPN/ABC, the American rights-holder at the time, was already committed to broadcasting college football on its channels during that day. American viewers who wanted to watch the game live could view the Canadian CBC broadcast on NHL Center Ice.
In 2008, some NBC affiliates decided instead to air the game on secondary channels often used for weather service. Therefore, in some markets, fans with a satellite service carrying DirecTV or DISH Network were unable to watch the game. Despite this, and competing with broadcasts of college football bowl games (this was particularly noted in the Detroit, Michigan market, usually a strong market for hockey ratings, where the Wolverines were playing in the Capital One Bowl), the game garnered a 2.6 rating and 5 share, the highest rating for a regular season NHL game since 1996, and the highest share since Wayne Gretzky's final game in 1999, in a near tie with second-place CBS' 2.7 rating for Gator Bowl coverage. The production earned a 38.1 rating in Buffalo and 17.7 rating in Pittsburgh, to lead all markets.
NBC had an airplane flying overhead to provide bird's-eye views of the rink, including a live webstream from its camera throughout the game. The announcers stood in a constructed perch on the penalty box side of the rink, in front of the stadium stands.
In 2009, Dave Strader filled-in for Mike Emrick on play-by-play for NBC because Emrick had laryngitis.
On January 3, 2009, the NHL reported that the overnight television ratings had increased 12% over the 2008 game. Nationally, the game had 2.9 overnight rating and a 6 share. In Chicago, Thursday's game drew a national high of an 11.8 rating and 21 share, with Detroit second at 10.5 and 21 (this despite that yet again, a Michigan-based team was playing in the Capital One Bowl opposite the Winter Classic—this time the Michigan State Spartans). Other above-average markets included Buffalo (whose 10.1 rating/20 share was comparable to Detroit's), St. Louis (5.3/10), Pittsburgh (4.4/8), Denver (4.2/10), Providence (3.5/7), Indianapolis (3.4/6), West Palm Beach (3.3/6), and Orlando (3.2/5). Each overnight ratings point equals about 735,000 TV homes. On January 12, the final ratings figure was announced. There was an average of 4.4 million viewers of the game on NBC, and this was the largest since the February 23, 1975 match between the Philadelphia Flyers and the New York Rangers.
The 2011 Winter Classic was delayed by seven hours due to rainy weather and ended up being played in prime time.
The 2012, the 2017, and the 2023 games were all played on January 2 since January 1 landed on a Sunday.
The 2013 game was cancelled on November 2, 2012, due to the 2012–13 NHL lockout.
NHL Network simulcast Sportsnet's coverage of the 2016 Heritage Classic.
NBCSN simulcast CBC and Sportsnet's coverage of the 2017 100 Classic and the 2019 Heritage Classic.
The 2021 Vegas–Colorado outdoor game at Lake Tahoe was delayed for eight hours due to poor ice conditions. NBC aired the entire first period, but the rest of the game was broadcast on NBCSN. The Philadelphia–Boston game at Lake Tahoe was also delayed for the same reason, forcing NBC to move the game to primetime on NBCSN, and moved the originally scheduled Devils–Capitals game to NBC. The NHL Outdoors at Lake Tahoe special replaced the originally scheduled Winter Classic and Stadium Series due to the COVID-19 pandemic.
On April 27, 2021, Turner Sports agreed to a seven-year deal with the National Hockey League to broadcast at least 72 games nationally on TNT and TBS beginning with the 2021–22 NHL season. The deal is reportedly worth $225 million and will include three Stanley Cup Finals, half of the conference finals, first and second round playoff games, and the Winter Classic.
Eddie Olczyk missed the 2022 Winter Classic on TNT after being placed on COVID-19 protocol. Keith Jones replaced Olczyk in the booth while Darren Pang filled Jones' position as an ice level analyst.
The 2022 Stadium Series was broadcast on TNT due to ABC's NBA coverage.
The 2023 Stadium Series was broadcast on ABC and ESPN+ due to TNT's broadcast of NBA All-Star Saturday. This marked ABC's first NHL outdoor game broadcast since reacquiring NHL coverage rights starting in the  season.

See also
Ratings in the United States

Canada (English)

Notes
The CBC television broadcast of the 2003 Heritage Classic set the record for most viewers of a single NHL game with 2.747 million nationwide. This was the first NHL game broadcast in HD on CBC.
Despite the overwhelming popularity of the original Heritage Classic between the Montreal Canadiens and the Edmonton Oilers in 2003, the popularity of the Winter Classic in Canada is low and declining. On Canada's CBC Television network, the Winter Classic has lower ratings than its weekly regular season telecasts Hockey Night in Canada. This has been attributed to the lack of Canadian teams in any of the Winter Classics and has led to a revival of the all-Canadian Heritage Classic.
In 2011, the seven-hour delay on the CBC broadcast schedule caused the classic to be completely preempted in the province of Ontario. The network's coverage of the NHL that night began with the Battle of Ontario at Scotiabank Place in Ottawa at 7 p.m. ET, and broke away to the Classic outside Ontario. The CBC truncated the broadcast after two hours in Alberta to show the Battle of Alberta at Rexall Place in Edmonton in its entirety.
TSN simulcasted NBCSN's coverage of the 2014 Stadium Series game between the Rangers and the Islanders.
There was no separate Canadian live telecast of the 2014 Stadium Series game in Chicago. CBC instead broadcast the Toronto Maple Leafs–Montreal Canadiens game being played at the same time.
Since 2016, Sportsnet uses the American broadcast feed in its broadcasts of the Winter Classic and Stadium Series, except when either game involves a Canadian-based team.
 The NBC feed of the 2019 Stadium Series was instead aired on Sportsnet One and Sportsnet 360. The Montreal Canadiens–Toronto Maple Leafs game that was being played at the same time was being simulcast on both CBC and Sportsnet.
The NBC feed of the 2020 Stadium Series was instead aired on Sportsnet 360. The Toronto Maple Leafs–Ottawa Senators game that was being played at the same time was being simulcast on both CBC and Sportsnet.
The TNT feed of the 2022 Winter Classic was instead aired on Sportsnet One. The Toronto Maple Leafs–Ottawa Senators game that was being played at the same time was being simulcast on both CBC and Sportsnet.
The TNT feed of the 2022 Stadium Series was instead aired on Sportsnet 360. The Toronto Maple Leafs–Detroit Red Wings game that was being played at the same time was being simulcast on both CBC and Sportsnet.

Canada (French)

Notes
On November 26, 2013, Rogers announced that it had reached a 12-year, $5.2 billion deal to become the exclusive national rightsholder for the National Hockey League, beginning in the 2014–15 season. Quebecor Media sub-licensed national French-language rights to the league for $110 million per season, making TVA Sports the official French-language cable broadcaster of the NHL. RDS retains regional rights to Montreal Canadiens games not broadcast by TVA Sports. Former Montreal Canadiens goalie José Theodore joined the network as an analyst. NHL games occupy a significant portion of TVA Sports' programming, with a particular emphasis on the Canadiens and other teams popular in Quebec, such as the Boston Bruins, Colorado Avalanche, Pittsburgh Penguins, and Toronto Maple Leafs. Certain nights will feature themed selections of games, such as a viewers' choice game on Monday nights, rivalry games, and games focusing on star players. TVA Sports' flagship Saturday night broadcast, La super soirée LNH, will air 22 Montreal Canadiens games per season, along with a second game on TVA Sports 2. TVA Sports also airs the All-Star Game, Winter Classic, and Stanley Cup Playoffs.

Finnish television

References

Broadcasters
CBC Sports
NBCSN
NBC Sports
TVA (Canadian TV network)
The Sports Network
Sportsnet
Turner Sports
Outdoor games
Winter Classic broadcasters
National Hockey League on the radio